Table Tennis England, formerly the English Table Tennis Association, is the national governing body for table tennis in England, responsible for representing, coordinating, administering, marketing and developing the sport. Most of its annual income comes from government grants and Sport England funding. Table Tennis England runs three separate national championships every year – for U10-U13 players; cadets and juniors; and seniors – as well as operating the British League, a Grand Prix series and other irregularly held tournaments, including the English Open.

History

It was founded as the Table Tennis Association in 1921. The organisation was known as the English Table Tennis Association between 1927 and 2014 and has been affiliated to the ITTF (International Table Tennis Federation) since 1927. Table Tennis England is based at Milton Keynes, having moved from Hastings in March 2014. The singer Andy Bell acted as an advisor from 1981 to 1983. It rebranded as Table Tennis England in May 2014.

The organisation was scheduled to move into a purpose-built headquarters near the National Bowl, Milton Keynes, to be shared with Badminton England, but the project has now been shelved.

Events/tournaments 
 English National Championships
 British League
 Grand Prix Circuit
 English Open

English major senior titles

Men's singles

Women's singles

Coaches 
Alan Cooke (Head Coach)
 Kelly Sibley

References

External links 

Organisations based in Milton Keynes
Sport in Milton Keynes
Table tennis in the United Kingdom
Table tennis organizations
1927 establishments in England
Sports organizations established in 1927